is a passenger railway station located in Izumi-ku, Yokohama, Japan, operated by the private railway operator Sagami Railway (Sotetsu).

Lines 
Izumi-chūō Station is served by the Sagami Railway Izumino Line, and lies 8.2 kilometers from the starting point of the line at Futamatagawa Station.

Station layout
The station consists of  one elevated island platform serving two tracks, connected to the station building by an underpass. The station building is built underneath the platforms and tracks.

Platforms

Adjacent stations

History 
Izumi-chūō Station was opened on April 4, 1990.

Passenger statistics
In fiscal 2019, the station was used by an average of 16,257 passengers daily.

The passenger figures for previous years are as shown below.

Surrounding area
 Yokohama City Izumi Ward Office
Yokohama City Izumi Auditorium
Yokohama City Nakawada Junior High School

See also
 List of railway stations in Japan

References

External links 

 Official home page  

Railway stations in Kanagawa Prefecture
Railway stations in Japan opened in 1990
Railway stations in Yokohama